Department of Women Affairs is a government department responsible for the welfare of women in Bangladesh and is located in Dhaka, Bangladesh. The department is head by Director General Parveen Akhter.

History
The government of Bangladesh founded the Department of Women Affairs on 18 February 1972. The department is under the Ministry of Women and Children Affairs. The center founded a national helpline to prevent violence against women. National Trauma Counselling Centre is located at the headquarters of the building. The department runs 43 day care centres throughout Bangladesh.

References

1972 establishments in Bangladesh
Organisations based in Dhaka
Government departments of Bangladesh
Women in Bangladesh